Bachelors Rest is an unincorporated community located in Pendleton County, Kentucky, United States.

According to tradition, the community was so named for the bachelors who would congregate and socialize at the local country store.

References

Unincorporated communities in Pendleton County, Kentucky
Unincorporated communities in Kentucky